This page details the process of qualifying for the 1962 African Cup of Nations. 7 African nations initially entered the competition.  Ethiopia and Egypt both automatically qualified as the host country and title holders respectively.  Morocco would withdraw before play began, thus leaving only 5 teams vying for the remaining two spots in the finals.

Qualified teams

The 4 qualified teams are:

Summary

The 6 nations were paired 2-by-2 and played knock-out matches home-and-away.  The 3 winners would then advance to the second round and pair off again to play home-and-away matches.  The winners of these pairings would qualify for the finals.  Qualifying took place between April 8, 1961, and December 10, 1961.

First round
Sudan withdrew before the draw.

|}

Tunisia advanced to the Second Round after the withdrawal of Morocco;  both matches were officially awarded to Tunisia 2–0.

The aggregate score was tied 2-2 after the two matches; Nigeria advanced to the Second Round after drawing lots.

The aggregate score was tied 1-1 after the two matches. While the regulations stipulated that the tie should be decided on lots, Kenya and Uganda felt it should be decided on the pitch: CAF agreed to their request to stage a playoff.

Playoff

Uganda advanced.

Second round

|}

The second leg was abandoned in the 65th minute after Nigeria walked off to protest the officiating following Tunisia's equalizer; Tunisia were awarded a 2–0 victory, and qualified by an aggregate score of 3–2.

Uganda qualified directly after a drawing of lots by CAF between the three group winners.

External links
 African Nations Cup 1962 - rsssf.com

1962
Qualification
Qual.